Bartłomiej Socha (born August 26, 1981 in Zabrze) is a Polish footballer who plays for Silesia Lubomia.

External links
 

1981 births
Living people
Polish footballers
Stal Mielec players
Zagłębie Sosnowiec players
Odra Wodzisław Śląski players
Aluminium Konin players
Górnik Zabrze players
Podbeskidzie Bielsko-Biała players
Kolejarz Stróże players
Sportspeople from Zabrze
Association football forwards